Together With Me is a 2017 Thai BL (Boys' Love) drama aired on LINE TV. It was broadcast on Wednesdays and Thursdays starting from August 24, 2017 to October 5, 2017.

It contains a total of 13 episodes with an average span of 50 minutes each. This story takes place before the events of Bad Romance: The Series. It focuses on Korn and Knock and how they met and all the obstacles they had to go through before they officially became a couple. There are 3 main couples in the series: Korn & Knock, Farm & Bright, Phubet & Kavitra.

In early 2018 it was announced that there would be a sequel titled "Together with Me: The Next Chapter" which will follow Korn & Knock's relationship after Bad Romance: The Series. The official release date is September 28, 2018.

Plot 
One day at Amphawa, Knock, a young engineering student, wakes up to a shock: he is naked next to his childhood best friend, Korn, due to drunkenness and hormones. After fighting and arguing, Korn and Knock agree to keep this as a secret. Korn's other best friend, Yiwha, takes matters into her own hands, and tries to expose Knock's girlfriend, Plern Pleng. During the span of this series, Korn and Knock fight a lot, but also have a lot of sweet moments together, and in the end they both confess to each other and start dating.

Cast 
 Nattapol Diloknawarit (Max) as Korn
 Pakorn Thanasrivanitchai (Tul) as Knock
 Pimnitchakun Bumrungkit (Maengmum) as Wanyiwha Trakarntapattawee (Yiwha)
 Satida Pinsinchai (Aim) as Plern Pleng (Pleng)
 Tantimaporn Supawit (C'game) as Farm
 Thitichaya Chiwpreecha (Olive) as Fai
 Apiwat Porsche (Porsch) as Bright
 Tripobphoom Suthaphong (Sek) as Mew
 Khamphee Noomnoi (Tem) as Phubet (Phu)
 Janistar Phomphadungcheep as Prae
 Sukonthawa Kerdnimit (Mai) as Kavitra
Visava Thaiyanont (Tomo) as Cho

Soundtracks 
The series has spawned 3 singles:

 "เข้าใจ" ( "Understood") by Singto Numchok (theme song).
 "ความรักที่ไม่ตั้งใจ" ( "Unintentional Love") by Tul Pakorn Thanasrivanitchai (Korn & Knock's theme).
 "Again" by C'game Tantimaporn Supawit (Farm & Bright's theme).

Below are music that were used in the television series:

References

External links 
 Official Facebook page
 

Thai television soap operas
2017 Thai television series debuts
2017 Thai television series endings
Television series by TV Thunder
Thai boys' love television series
2010s LGBT-related comedy television series
2010s LGBT-related drama television series